Haruyoshi Nagae (1893–1960) was a Japanese painter. His work was part of the painting event in the art competition at the 1932 Summer Olympics.

References

1893 births
1960 deaths
20th-century Japanese painters
Japanese painters
Olympic competitors in art competitions
People from Kyoto